This is a list of foreign-born soccer players who played for the Australia national soccer team.

Players

Argentina 
 Walter Ardone
 Pablo Cardozo
 Oscar Crino
 Rodolfo Gnavi
 Gabriel Mendez

Austria 
 James Jeggo

Brazil 
 Agenor Muniz

Croatia 
 Miloš Degenek
 Fran Karacic

Czechoslovakia 
 Mildo Mueller
 David Zeman

Egypt 
 Garang Kuol

England 

 Stan Ackerley
 Alan Ainslie
 Adrian Alston
 Francis Awaritefe
 Roy Blitz
 Ken Boden
 Wilfred Bratton
 Greg Brown
 Gary Byrne
 Alec Cameron
 Jim Campbell
 Gary Cole
 Robert Cornthwaite
 John Coyne
 Martyn Crook
 Duncan Cummings
 John Davies
 Mike Denton
 Bill Edwards
 William Faulkner
 Jack Gilmour
 Dave Harding
 Tony Henderson
 Clem Higgins
 Ray Ilott
 Neil Kilkenny
 Ray Lloyd
 David Lowe

 Alf Mackey
 Jack Mather
 Frank McIver
 Frank Millier-Smith
 Kevin Muscat
 Alan Niven
 George Nuttall
 Phil O'Connor
 Tommy Oliver
 Peter Ollerton
 Ralph Piercy
 David Ratcliffe
 Ray Richards
 Jim Robison
 Robbie Slater
 Geoff Sleight
 Matt Smith
 John Spanos
 Warren Spink
 Pete Stone
 Ryan Strain
 Jim Tansey
 Jack Taylor
 Paul Wade
 Danny Walsh
 Johnny Watkiss
 Alf White
 Peter Wilson
 John Yzendoorn

France 
 Denis Genreau

Germany 
 Roger Romanowicz
 Manfred Schaefer
 Les Scheinflug

Greece 
 Apostolos Giannou
 George Haniotis
 Peter Katholos
 Ange Postecoglou
 Peter Raskopoulos

Hong Kong 
 Connor Pain

Hungary 
 Attila Abonyi
 Peter Fuzes
 Steve Herczeg
 George Kulcsar
 Les Suchanek

Iran 
 Daniel Arzani

Ireland 
 John Doyle
 Alex Gibb

Italy 
 Raphael Bove
 John Giacometti
 John Perin
 Wally Savor

Kenya 
 Thomas Deng
 Awer Mabil

Lebanon 
 Abbas Saad

Malta 
 Lou Vella

Mauritius 
 Jean-Paul de Marigny

Netherlands 
 Ted de Lyster
 Dick van Alphen

New Zealand 
 Archie Thompson

Nigeria 
 Bernie Ibini

Northern Ireland 
 Ron Adair
 Alan Hunter
 Frank Loughran
 Billy Rice

Romania 
 Josip Picioane

Russia 
 Aku Roth

Scotland 

 John Anderson
 Jim Armstrong
 Steve Blair
 Archie Blue
 George Blues
 Martin Boyle
 Peter Boyle
 Jimmy Cant
 Billy Cook
 Dave Cumberford
 Jock Cumberford
 Tommy Cumming
 Jason Cummings
 Ian Davidson
 Robbie Dunn
 Charlie Egan
 Alec Forrest
 Alec Heaney
 Andy Henderson
 Bobby Hogg
 Pat Hughes
 Sandy Irvine
 Tom Jack
 George Keith
 John Little
 James Love
 Jimmy Mackay
 Alan Marnoch

 Jim McCabe
 Tommy McColl
 Tom McCulloch
 John McDonald
 Garry McDowall
 Hamilton McMeechan
 Dave Mitchell
 Jim Muir
 Bill Murphy
 Kenny Murphy
 Johnny Orr
 Jamie Paton
 Jim Pearson
 Johnny Peebles
 George Raitt
 Jack Reilly
 Harry Rice
 Jimmy Rooney
 Willie Rutherford
 Nigel Shepherd
 Harry Souttar
 John Stevenson
 Tom Tennant
 Sid Thomas
 Joe Watson
 Bob Wemyss
 Alan Westwater

South Africa 
 Keanu Baccus
 Charlie O'Connor
 Billy Rogers
 Kimon Taliadoros
 Jack White

Southern Rhodesia 
 Cliff van Blerk

Sudan 
 Ruon Tongyik

Turkey 
 Aytek Genc

Ukraine 
 Nikita Rukavytsya

United States 
 Bruce Djite
 Angus "Billy" Gibb

Uruguay 
 Bruno Fornaroli

Wales 
 Billy Price

Yugoslavia 
 Eli Babalj
 Yakka Banovic
 Vlado Bozinovski
 Branko Buljevic
 Billy Celeski
 Dino Djulbic
 Mehmet Duraković
 Milan Ivanović
 Mike Micevski
 Frank Micic
 Branko Milosevic
 Žarko Odžakov
 Ivo Prskalo
 Mendo Ristovski
 Ernie Tapai
 Doug Utjesenovic
 Dario Vidošić
 Billy Vojtek

List by country of birth 
England is the country where most of foreign-born Australian players were born where as Scotland is a close a 2nd.

See also
List of England international footballers born in Australia
List of Croatia international footballers born in Australia
List of Lebanon international footballers born in Australia
List of Netherlands international footballers born in Australia
List of New Zealand international footballers born in Australia
List of Scotland international footballers born in Australia

References
General

Specific

External links
Current Australian squad profiles at Football Federation of Australia
Australian Online Football Museum
OzFootball - The Australian Football Site
List of Australian internationals from 1922 to June 2008, ordered chronologically by debut, and also alphabetically

born outside
Lists of expatriate association football players
Association football player non-biographical articles
Immigration to Australia
Australian diaspora
Change of nationality in sport